American Library may refer to:

Associations
American Association of Law Libraries
American Indian Library Association
American Library Association
American Theological Library Association

Book collections
American Law Library
American Sportsman's Library
The American School Library

Libraries
American Libraries
American Library in Paris
American Library (New Delhi)
American Spaces
Amerika-Gedenkbibliothek
Digital Public Library of America
Library of American Broadcasting
Library of Congress
New York Public Library

Publishers
Library of America
New American Library

Related lists
List of American Library Association accredited library schools
List of the largest libraries in the United States
List of U.S. state library associations
Public libraries in North America

Miscellaneous
American Libraries (magazine)
The American Library (art installation)